In Georgia folklore, the Altamaha-ha (or Altie) is a legendary creature, alleged to inhabit the myriad small streams and abandoned rice fields near the mouth of the Altamaha River (after which it is named) in southeastern Georgia. Sightings are particularly reported around Darien and elsewhere in McIntosh County.

According to The Brunswick News, the legend has its roots in Muscogee tradition. An alligator gar has been proposed as being a possible identity for recent sightings attributed to the creature.

In 2018, decomposing remains were found on a beach in the Wolf Island National Wildlife Refuge, causing speculation that it may be the body of an Altamaha-ha; however, performance artist Zardulu later claimed responsibility for the remains, which were created out of a stuffed shark and papier-mâché.

References

External links

American legendary creatures
Georgia folklore
Legendary creatures of the indigenous peoples of North America
Muscogee
Water monsters